Lamoral, 1st Prince of Ligne (19 July 1563, in Château de Belœil – 6 February 1624, in Brussels) was a diplomat in the 17th century.

Early life 
Lamoral, Count and after 1601 first Prince de Ligne and Prince d'Épinoy, was the son of Philip, Count of Ligne (died 1583), and his wife, Countess Marguerite de Lalaing (died 1598), daughter of Philip, Count of Hoogstraten. He was the uncle of Rasse of Gavre, 1st Marquess of Ayseau.

Biography 
As a diplomat, the first Prince de Ligne was involved in many historic events of his time. He represented Archduke Albert of Austria and Infanta Isabella Clara Eugenia of Spain at the French court of Henri IV of France, in Spain and again in Paris, to congratulate King Louis XIII of France with his marriage with the daughter of Philip III of Spain. During this mission, he discussed several issues with the French political leaders. 

In 1601 he received from Rudolf II, Holy Roman Emperor the hereditary title of Prince de Ligne.

In 1621 Prince Lamoral I was made grandee of Spain by King Philip IV of Spain for his services rendered to the Crown. He was also made a Knight in the Order of the Golden Fleece.

Marriage and children 
In 1584 Lamoral married Anne-Marie de Melun (died 1634), Marquise de Roubaix, daughter of Hugues II de Melun (1520–1553). They had five children:
 Yolande (1585–1611), married in 1599 to Charles Alexandre de Croÿ, Marquis d’Havré (1581–1624), son of Charles Philippe; had one daughter.
 Florent (1588–1622), Marquis de Roubaix, married in 1608 with Princess Louise of Lorraine-Chaligny (1594–1667), daughter of Henri de Lorraine-Chaligny. They had:
  Albert Henri (1615–1641), 2nd Prince de Ligne, married his cousin Princess Claire-Marie of Nassau-Siegen (1621–1695), daughter of Ernestine Yolande de Ligne and John VIII, Count of Nassau-Siegen; no issue.
 Claude Lamoral (1618–1679), 3rd Prince de Ligne, married his brother's widow; had issue.
 Anne (1590–1651), married Felipe Folch de Cardona, Marquis de Guadelesta ; had one daughter:
 Maria Felipa (b. 1614), who married Don Francisco de Palafox y Blanes, Marquis de Ariza, Señor de Cortes.
 Lambertine (1593–1651), married firstly Philibert de La Baume, Marquis de Saint-Martin-le-Châtel (1586–1610); had one daughter. She married secondly Count Christopher of Ostfriesland. She married for the third time, Jean Baptiste de La Baume, 4.Marquis de Saint-Martin-le-Châtel (1593-1641).
 Ernestine Yolande (1594–1668), married in 1618 to John VIII, Count of Nassau-Siegen (1583–1638); had issue.

References 

 

1563 births
1624 deaths
Grandees of Spain
01
Knights of the Golden Fleece
Princes of Epinoy
01